Jean Marie Marcel Albert Pitres (26 August 1848 – 25 March 1928) was a French neurological physician. He was born in Bordeaux and received his training in Paris, where he was the student of Jean Martin Charcot (1825–1893) and Louis-Antoine Ranvier (1835–1922). He served as dean of the Faculty of Medicine at the University of Bordeaux – appointed 1885.

He began his medical studies in Bordeaux, later working as an interne to the hospitals of Paris (from 1872). In 1877, he defended his doctoral thesis, and during the following year received his agrégation with a dissertation titled "Les hypertrophies et les dilatations cardiaques indépendante des lésions valvulaires". In the late 1870s, with Charles-Émile François-Franck, he performed studies on the excitation of the cerebral cortex and the localization of brain function. Pitres died in 1928, at the age of 79, after falling down stairs.

Lessons that Pitres gave at the amphitheater in Bordeaux on the following subjects were compiled and published: hysteria and hypnotism (1891), amnesic aphasia (1897), paraphasia (1898) and physical signs associated with pleural effusions (1902). His studies of peripheral neuritis were published in volume 36 of Augustin Nicolas Gilbert and Paul Carnot's Nouveau traité de médeine et de thérapeutique. With Leo Testut (1849–1925), he was co-author of Les nerfs en schémas, anatomie et physiopathologie (1925).

His name became associated with pleural effusion and with tabes dorsalis. The term "Pitres' sign" refers to hypoesthesia of the scrotum and testicles in tabes dorsalis.

References

External links 
 Les biographies de neurologues biography 

1848 births
1928 deaths
French neurologists
Physicians from Bordeaux
Academic staff of the University of Bordeaux